XSON is a chip package and stands for "plastic eXtremely thin Small OutliNe package".  It's a package where the chip is encapsulated in a block and on the underside the leads are present as strips.

References 

Chip carriers